Anton Leonard (born 31 May 1974 in Durban) is a South African former rugby union player and current coach. He played as a number 8.

Career
Playing for the Stormers, he was called up relatively late in the Springboks (25 years): he was called eventually by the coach Nick Mallett for the 1999 Rugby World Cup South African roster  where Leonard played two matches, his only two international caps, arriving third at the tournament.

Playing for the Bulls, he first retired in 2005; returning in late 2006, he won the 2007 Super 14 season and retired the next year. As coach, by late 2010 he became forwards coach for the Currie Cup team Griqualand West Griquas.

Trophies
Super Rugby
Bulls: 2007

Notes

External links

1974 births
Living people
Rugby union number eights
Rugby union players from Durban
South Africa international rugby union players
South African rugby union coaches
South African rugby union players
Bulls (rugby union) players